Hwang Shinwei is a Taiwanese game programmer. From 1988 to 1991, he developed NES video games without a license from Nintendo, mostly published by RCM Co., Ltd. (also known as RCM Group or simply RCM, standing for RamCo Man International). His titles are both originals and popular clones, some of which originally not converted for the console (such as Rally-X). They appeared all on different multicarts but, others like Brush Roller and Magic Jewelry, were released also on standalone cartridge format, however, those games usually does removed copyright information when in pirate NES/Famicom multicarts, even some single release cartridges. Shinwei retired from NES game development around 1991, coinciding with a Nintendo lawsuit against several Taiwanese companies (including RCM) for their counterfeiting activities.

List of Hwang Shinwei games

Clone titles

Original titles

Multi-game cartridges

References

Living people
Taiwanese computer programmers
Video game programmers
Year of birth missing (living people)